Bursch is a German surname. Notable people with the surname include:

Daniel W. Bursch (born 1957), American astronaut
John J. Bursch (born 1972), American lawyer
Marvin W. Bursch (1917-2000), American businessman and politician
Roger G. Bursch (1920-2014), American Racecar Driver, Mechanic and Porsche Pioneer

References

German-language surnames